Norderfriedrichskoog is a municipality in the district of Nordfriesland, in Schleswig-Holstein, Germany.

Former tax haven
In the 1990s, Norderfriedrichskoog became a popular 0% tax haven, and by 2003 the village, with a population of only 47, was home to over 500 companies, including Deutsche Bank, Eli Lilly and Company, Unilever, Lufthansa and E.On. The tax regime was changed by the federal government in 2004 to enforce a minimum percentage rate, thus removing Norderfriedrichskoog's competitive advantage.

See also
 Eiderstedt Peninsula

References

External links 

Municipalities in Schleswig-Holstein
Nordfriesland